Qualification for the women's tournament at the 2018 Winter Olympics determined by the IIHF World Ranking following the 2016 Women's Ice Hockey World Championships. The top five teams in the World Ranking received automatic berths into the Olympics, South Korea has received an automatic berth as host, and all other member nations had an opportunity to qualify for the remaining two spots.

Qualified teams

Notes

Qualification seeding
To qualify directly, a nation had to be ranked in the top five following the 2016 IIHF Women's World Championship. Using the IIHF World Ranking points system, the 2016 received full value, and each preceding year was worth 25% less. Teams that wished to compete must apply in "early spring of 2016". The following is a ranking based on points accumulated toward Olympic qualification of all countries.

Points were earned based on overall finish, available points for 2016 were as follows:

Ireland is not listed despite having achieved ranking points because they are not currently participating.
Nations with no shading chose not to participate in Olympic qualifying.

Preliminary round 1
This round was played from 7 to 9 October 2016 in Mexico City. The winner advanced to the preliminary round 2 as qualifier seven.

Group J

All times are local (UTC–5).

Preliminary round 2
This round was played between 3–6 November 2016 in Astana, Kazakhstan and San Sebastián, Spain. The winner of each group advanced to the preliminary round 3 as qualifiers five and six, ranked according their seeding.

Group G

All times are local (UTC+6).

Group H

All times are local (UTC+1).

Preliminary round 3
Two round robins were played between 15 and 18 December 2016 in Cergy-Pontoise France, and Stavanger Norway. The winners of each advanced to the final qualification tournaments as qualifiers three and four, ranked according to their seeding.

Group E

All times are local (UTC+1).

Group F

All times are local (UTC+1).

Final qualification
Two round robins were played from 9 to 12 February 2017 in Arosa, Switzerland and Tomakomai, Japan. The two group winners qualified for the Olympic tournament Group B.

Group C

All times are local (UTC+1).

Group D

All times are local (UTC+9).

References

qualification
Qualification for the 2018 Winter Olympics
2016 in ice hockey
2017 in ice hockey